The Rose Center for Earth and Space is a part of the American Museum of Natural History in New York City. The Center's complete name is The Frederick Phineas and Sandra Priest Rose Center for Earth and Space. The main entrance is located on the northern side of the museum on 81st Street near Central Park West in Manhattan's Upper West Side. Completed in 2000, it includes the new Hayden Planetarium, the original of which was opened in 1935 and closed in 1997. Neil deGrasse Tyson is its first and, only director.

History

The center is an extensive reworking of the former Hayden Planetarium, whose first projector, dedicated in 1935, had 2 successors previous to the current one.

The original Hayden Planetarium was founded in 1933 with a donation by philanthropist Charles Hayden. In 1935, the Hayden Planetarium, designed by architects Trowbridge & Livingston, opened, after its construction was funded by a $650,000 loan from the Reconstruction Finance Corporation and a $150,000 donation from banker Charles Hayden of Hayden, Stone & Co.  Its mission was to give the public "a more lively and sincere appreciation of the magnitude of the universe... and for the wonderful things which are daily occurring in the universe." Joseph M. Chamberlain, hired as an assistant curator in 1952, became Chairman of the Planetarium in 1956. In 1960, a Zeiss Mark IV projector was installed, followed by a Zeiss Mark VI projector and new seats in 1993.

In January 1997, the original Hayden Planetarium was closed and demolished. In August 1999, a new, customized Zeiss Mark IX projector was installed, accompanied by a digital dome projection system that provides a 3-D visualization of the universe based on images generated in real time by a Silicon Graphics supercomputer.

On February 19, 2000, the $210 million Frederick Phineas and Sandra Priest Rose Center for Earth and Space, containing the new Hayden Planetarium, opened to the public. The Rose Center is named after two members of the Rose family, and was designed by James Polshek and Todd H. Schliemann of Polshek Partnership Architects with the exhibition design by Ralph Appelbaum Associates. The Museum's garden was designed by Seattle based landscape architecture firm Gustafson, Guthrie, Nichol.  Tom Hanks provided the voice-over for the first planetarium show during the opening of the new Rose Center for Earth & Space in the Hayden Planetarium in 2000. Since then such celebrities as Whoopi Goldberg, Robert Redford, Harrison Ford, Liam Neeson and Maya Angelou have been featured.

Design

Designed by Polshek and Todd Schliemann, the building consists of a six-story high glass cube enclosing the  illuminated Hayden Sphere, which appears to float, although it is actually supported by truss work. Polshek has referred to this work as a "cosmic cathedral".

The Rose Center and its adjacent plaza are both located on the north face of the Museum; the Center encloses  of research, education, and exhibition spaces, in addition to the Hayden Planetarium. Also located in the facility is the Department of Astrophysics, the newest academic research department in the Museum. This structure, a small companion piece to the Rose Center, offers a new entry way to the Museum, as well as opening further exhibition space for astronomically-related objects. The planetarium's original magazine, The Sky, merged with another journal, The Telescope, to become the leading astronomy magazine Sky & Telescope.

Exclusion of Pluto as a Planet
The exhibits highlight human connection to the cosmos along with the scale and properties of the observable universe itself. The new Rose Center opened on 19 February 2000 with a model of only eight planets, excluding Pluto, when there has not been a scientific consensus whether it is a planet or not, and much of the American public thought of it as the ninth planet. On 22 January 2001, almost a year later, the New York Times reported it on its front page and led to much media attention and public controversy.

Hayden Planetarium

The Hayden Planetarium (often called "The Hayden Sphere" or "The Great Sphere") has, since 2000, been one of the two main attractions within the Rose Center. It was established by the State of New York in 1933, some of the funding coming from philanthropist Charles Hayden.  The top half of the Hayden Sphere houses the Star Theater, which uses high-resolution fulldome video to project “space shows” based on scientific visualization of current astrophysical data, in addition to a customized Zeiss Star Projector system replicating an accurate night sky as seen from Earth.

The Big Bang Theater occupies the bottom half of the Hayden Sphere. Utilizing a screen that measures  in diameter over an  bowl, a four-minute program depicts the birth of the universe, with narration by Liam Neeson. The Big Bang Theater serves as an introduction to the Heilbrun Cosmic Pathway, a spiral which wraps around the sphere, connecting the second and first floors of the Rose Center. The cosmic pathway provides a timeline of the universe's history from the Big Bang to the present day.  The Heilbrun Cosmic Pathway is one of the most popular exhibits in the Rose Center, which opened February 19, 2000.

The Hayden Planetarium offers a number of courses and public presentations including the Frontiers of Astrophysics and Distinguished Authors lecture series.

Arthur Ross Terrace
The Arthur Ross Terrace is adjacent to the Rose Center for Earth and Space, and built over the new parking garage on 81st Street. This rooftop plaza is designed to be a stage set that celebrates both astronomy and Earth’s natural history, as well as an outdoor gathering place for museum visitors. Renowned landscape architect Kathryn Gustafson formed the concept for the Terrace after seeing an illustration of shadows cast by a lunar eclipse. A terrace covering  was designed by Charles Morris Anderson as a Landscape Architect, and his design was awarded the American Society of Landscape Architects (ASLA) Design award in 2003.

Exhibits and shows

, five shows have premiered in the theater. The first show, Passport to the Universe, opened with the new theater and features the voice of Tom Hanks as a guide along a voyage from Earth to the edge of the observable universe. The Search for Life: Are We Alone? debuted in 2002, with narration by Harrison Ford describing the possibilities of extraterrestrial life. Opened in 2006 and narrated by Robert Redford, Cosmic Collisions examines the role that impacts have played in shaping the universe—including visualizations of Earth's magnetosphere, the formation of the Moon, and the meteorite impact that contributed to the end of the age of dinosaurs. Journey to the Stars, narrated by Whoopi Goldberg, premiered on, July 4, 2009, featuring extraordinary images from telescopes on the ground and in space and stunning, never-before-seen visualizations of physics-based simulations. Dark Universe, narrated by Neil deGrasse Tyson, premiered on November 2, 2013. Worlds Beyond Earth narrated by Lupita Nyong'o, premiered on March 24, 2021. It tells the story of the dynamic worlds that share our solar system and the unique conditions that make life on Earth possible.

Other exhibits can be found outside the sphere. The Gottesman Hall of the Planet Earth has displays that illustrate the Earth's geological history and weather patterns. The Cullman Hall of the Universe focuses on topics ranging from planets to stars, life on other worlds to current cosmology. The Scales of the Universe exhibit makes comparisons between the size of the Hayden Sphere and other objects in the universe presented at appropriate relative scale. There is also a photographic exhibit about the Apollo moon landings. The photographs are throughout the first floor level of the Rose Center.

The British playwright, Stephen Laughton, is the current writer-in-residence.

In popular culture
 1979: The planetarium appears as a backdrop for scenes in the film Manhattan. Woody Allen and Diane Keaton play characters who walk around within the planetarium after escaping from a sudden downburst of rain.
 2001: The planetarium is briefly seen in the film K-PAX starring Kevin Spacey and Jeff Bridges.
 2002: The planetarium is briefly seen in the film Men in Black II starring Tommy Lee Jones and Will Smith.
 2003: The planetarium features briefly in the film Eloise at the Plaza starring Sofia Vassilieva and Julie Andrews.
 2011: The planetarium is used as part of an investigation in the White Collar episode "Where There's a Will" (S03E02).
 2014: The planetarium is briefly seen in the film Night at the Museum: Secret of the Tomb starring Ben Stiller and Robin Williams.

See also
List of museums and cultural institutions in New York City

References

External links

Rose Center exhibitions

 Cosmic Pathway
 Hall of Planet Earth
 Hall of the Universe
 Hayden Big Bang Theater
 Hayden Planetarium
 Scales of the Universe

Hayden Planetarium

Summary of the Hayden Planetarium from the Zeiss website

 Arthur Ross Terrace
 ASLA DESIGN AWARD 2003: ARTHUR ROSS TERRACE

Planetaria in the United States
Science museums in New York City
American Museum of Natural History
Museums established in 2000
2000 establishments in New York City
Museums in Manhattan